Henry A. Walsh was an American priest of the Archdiocese of Boston.

Personal life
Walsh was born in Newton, Massachusetts but moved as a child to East Boston where he attended the Chapman School. He then attended Boston College and was graduated in 1883. He attended the Grand Séminaire de Montréal for several years until Saint John's Seminary in Boston was complete. Once it was, he transferred to St. John's and was ordained as a member of their first class.

He had two brothers, Richard L., who was also a priest, and Edward B. Both priests were on the altar when Edward was married.

Ministry

He was ordained June 25, 1887 at the Cathedral of the Holy Cross by Bishop Matthew Harkins. He was well known within the diocese.

Walsh's first assignment was to St. Mary's Church in Randolph, Massachusetts. He remained there for 10 years. Walsh then spent 10 years as an assistant pastor at St. Charles' parish in Woburn, Massachusetts. In 1902, while saying mass for more than 700 people, a fire was discovered in the church. Walsh alerted the congregation and asked them to calmly leave the church, which they did.

In 1908, Walsh became a pastor for the first time at Sacred Heart Church in South Natick. In 1917, Walsh was made the first pastor of a newly created parish in Needham, Massachusetts.

When Walsh was transferred from Needham to St. Mary's Church in Dedham, a public reception was held for him at the town hall. He arrived in Dedham on July 16, 1923. As the construction on the church had recently been finished, Walsh was able to focus on the various groups and societies within the parish. His pastorate ended with his death in 1929.

Death
Walsh died on February 2, 1929, at the St. Mary's rectory of pneumonia. As his body lay in state in the church, delegations from various societies took turns standing as honor guards as the public filed by. A mass was said for the repose of his soul at 8 a.m. for the children of the parish, and a solemn Requiem Mass was said at 10 am.

The church, which has a seating capacity of 1,500, was not big enough for all those who wished to attend. In attendance were other priests from the Archdiocese, clergy from other denominations, government officials, parishioners, and residents. The priests' choir provided music. The honorary pallbearers came from the ranks of the Fourth Degree Knights of Columbus. He was buried in Holy Cross Cemetery in Malden, Massachusetts.

References

Works cited

Clergy from Dedham, Massachusetts
People from Natick, Massachusetts
Roman Catholic clergy from Boston
People from Woburn, Massachusetts
People from Newton, Massachusetts
People from Randolph, Massachusetts
Boston College alumni
American Roman Catholic priests
1929 deaths
Roman Catholic Archdiocese of Boston